Jamesson Andrade de Brito  (born 13 August 1985) is a Brazilian footballer who plays for Santa Cruz.

References

Player profile at Sambafoot

1985 births
Living people
Brazilian footballers
Santa Cruz Futebol Clube players
Sportspeople from Pernambuco
Association football defenders
People from Paulista